Miami Beach Towers is a private housing estate located in Tuen Mun, New Territories, Hong Kong near Light Rail Tuen Mun Ferry Pier stop. It was built by Sino Land on land reclaimed from Castle Peak Bay.

Features

The estate consists of 6 residential buildings built in two phases. Phase 1, incorporating Blocks 1, 2 and 3, was completed in 1991. Phase 2, incorporating Blocks 4, 5 and 6, was completed in 1992. The three buildings in each phase are arranged in the shape of a concave curve.

In addition to the residential buildings, there four car parks and two clubhouses that provide a variety of leisure and recreational services. Facilities inside the estate include a 50m length swimming pool, squash courts, tennis and badminton courts, table tennis tables, a gymnasium, spa and saunas. The clubrooms also have a children's play area, snooker tables, a small library / homework area and meeting rooms. The car parking facilities on the estate are open to both residents and the general public.

References

External links 

 Emporis: Miami Beach Towers
 Centaline: Miami Beach Towers Transaction Data

Tuen Mun
Private housing estates in Hong Kong